= Manas Rural Development Institute =

Non-profit organization

Manas Rural Development Institute is a non-profit organization that carries out farmer awareness and training workshops to teach farmers the techniques of organic farming.

It conducts workshops to create awareness about the Indian science of Ayurveda and its benefits.

The aim of Manas Rural Development Institute is to help Indian farmers who have small farms and less resources to coordinate and form model villages where agriculture is carried out collectively and organically. Manas is currently active in the states of Maharashtra, Gujarat, and Madhya Pradesh states of India. It has built up a large base of associated farmers covering more than 20000 acres of organic certified farm land.
